Guddad Hulikatti is a village in Dharwad district of Karnataka, India.

Demographics 
As of the 2011 Census of India there were 300 households in Guddad Hulikatti and a total population of 1,518 consisting of 810 males and 708 females. There were 206 children ages 0-6.

References

Villages in Dharwad district